Rayson Tan Tai Ming (born 12 January 1965) is a Singaporean actor.

Career
Before joining MediaCorp, Tan worked as a flight attendant with Singapore Airlines. In 1990, he emerged as the 2nd Runner-Up in Singapore's Star Search Singapore talent competition. He has worked on many different roles and hosted many TV programmes, including the role of Singaporean war hero Lim Bo Seng in the 1997 WWII drama series The Price of Peace and the host for PSC Night in 2006.

Tan has also been nominated multiple times in the annual Star Awards, especially for the "Best Supporting Actor" award category. He has wrapped up a long form drama, Life Less Ordinary.

Tan has gotten 1 out of 10 Top 10 Most Popular Male Artistes from 1997 respectively.

Personal life
Tan married fellow MediaCorp actress Chen Liping in 1998. They have a son named Xavier, who was born in 2002. In 2008, Tan and his wife embraced Christianity.

Slim 10 saga 
In 2003, Tan was sued by fellow actress Andrea De Cruz in the Slim 10 pills saga. De Cruz began her court battle against the importers and distributors of diet pills that she says nearly caused her to die of liver failure. De Cruz was seeking damages for injuries she alleged were caused by the drug and to cover the cost of her liver transplant surgery and treatment against the pill's against Health Biz, the importer and distributor of Slim 10 diet pills and also Tan, who sold the pills to her. Tan was later cleared while the distributors were forced to compensate her. He was acquitted of the charges in the lawsuit.

Filmography

Chinese/Dialect Series

Awards and nominations

References

External links

Profile on xin.msn.com

1965 births
Converts to Christianity from Buddhism
Living people
Singaporean male television actors
Singaporean people of Teochew descent